Ankaase is a village in the Afigya Kwabre South District, a district in the Ashanti Region of Ghana.

References

Populated places in the Ashanti Region